Craterosaurus (meaning krater reptile or bowl reptile) was a genus of stegosaurid dinosaur. It lived during the Early Cretaceous (Aptian to Albian stages) around 121-113 million years ago. Its fossils were found in the Woburn Sands Formation of England. Craterosaurus may actually be a junior synonym of Regnosaurus, but only one fossil, a partial vertebra, was recovered.

The type (and only known) species is Craterosaurus pottonensis, described in 1874 by Harry Seeley. The specific name refers to the Potton bonebed. Seeley mistook the fossil, holotype SMC B.28814, for the base of a cranium. Franz Nopcsa in 1912 correctly identified it as the front part of a neural arch. Craterosaurus was placed in Stegosauria by Galton, although subsequent authors did not recognize Craterosaurus as a distinct, valid taxon.

See also 

 Timeline of stegosaur research

References 

Stegosaurs
Barremian life
Valanginian life
Early Cretaceous dinosaurs of Europe
Cretaceous United Kingdom
Fossils of England
Fossil taxa described in 1874
Taxa named by Harry Seeley
Nomina dubia
Ornithischian genera